The 2000 Amsterdam Admirals season was the sixth season for the franchise in the NFL Europe League (NFLEL). The team was led by head coach Al Luginbill in his sixth year, and played its home games at Amsterdam ArenA and Olympisch Stadion in Amsterdam, Netherlands. They finished the regular season in fourth place with a record of four wins and six losses.

Offseason

Free agent draft

Personnel

Staff

Roster

Schedule

Standings

Notes

References

Amsterdam
Amsterdam Admirals seasons